Thessalian vase painting was a regional style of Greek vase painting, prevalent in Thessaly.

The Geometric vase painting of Thessaly was rather lifeless and provincial, especially compared to the dominant production centres such as Attica. Often, Attic styles were simply imitated.

Bibliography 
 Gerald P. Schaus: Geometrische Vasenmalerei, In: Der Neue Pauly, vol. 4 (1998), cols. 935-938

Ancient Greece in art and culture
Ancient Greek vase-painting styles